American singer Bebe Rexha won her first award for songwriting when she was a teenager. She submitted a song to be performed at the National Academy of Recording Arts & Sciences' annual "Grammy Day" event and surpassed 700 other entrants, earning the "Best Teen Songwriter" award. In 2010, she became the lead vocalist for the Black Cards, an experimental electro-music band formed by Fall Out Boy bassist Pete Wentz, and was eventually awarded the Abe Olman Scholarship in 2012 for her songwriting contributions during that time.

Rexha received her first major songwriting award at the BMI Pop Awards in 2015, for Eminem's "The Monster". Later that year, she also received nominations at the NRJ Music Awards, the Teen Choice Awards, and the MTV Europe Music Awards for her appearance on the David Guetta collaboration single "Hey Mama", which she co-wrote. She would go on to win three BMI awards for the song in 2016. The following year, Rexha won three ASCAP awards and four BMI awards for "Me, Myself & I", which she co-wrote with G-Eazy.

Awards and nominations

Notes

References

External links 
 Official website

Awards
Rexha, Bebe